Orchid Park Secondary School (OPSS) is a co-educational government secondary school in Yishun, Singapore.

History
Orchid Park begun its operation in January 1999 on the premises of Woodlands Ring Secondary School with a staff of 16 and a student population of 360. The school moved to its current premises at 10 Yishun Street 81 on 13 September that year. The official opening of the school took place on 21 April 2001, led by Tan Boon Wan, Member of Parliament for Ang Mo Kio GRC.
 
It was decided that a grand arts event be held every three years. Arts Panache I on the theme 'Love and Peace' was held on 3 April 2004, and Arts Panache II, a musical entitled 'Club Soul', took place on 13 and 14 April 2007. On 13 April 2002, the Art Gallery was opened, featuring art pieces by pupils.
 
The school's first venture into business enterprise, the Art Rock Cafe, was officially declared open on 13 April 2002. It is a business run by pupils after school hours. To provide more opportunities for pupils to develop entrepreneurial skills Le Shoppe was opened on 8 April 2005. Another manifestation of business enterprise in the school is The Wardrobe, equipped with period and dance costumes available on-line for loan to other schools.

Notable alumni
 Gibran Rakabuming Raka, the eldest son of Joko Widodo, the seventh president of Indonesia.
 Ian Ang, Co-founder and CEO of Secretlab.

Principals

References

External links
 School website

Secondary schools in Singapore
Educational institutions established in 1999
Schools in Yishun
1999 establishments in Singapore